"Tropicalia" is a song from Beck's 1998 album Mutations. It was released as a single in the UK in December 1998. The B-side "Halo of Gold" is a drastically reworked cover version of "Furry Heroine (Halo of Gold)" by Skip Spence.

Beck said that "Tropicalia"'s inspiration was "I've always loved a lot of different exotic music. I've been listening to Brazilian music since I was a kid, but I haven't really felt it was something that would come naturally until the last few years. I think for something like 'Tropicalia' I needed to go to places where that music existed in order to get to the point where I could do it myself. I wrote it in the back of the bus on tour, and then later I put lyrics to it. A lot of times I write the melody and the chords of the songs sometimes years before I ever get around it writing lyrics, so it just sits there incubating."

Beck does not play any instrument in the song.

Track listings

CD
 "Tropicalia" – 3:23
 "Halo of Gold" – 4:29
 "Black Balloon" – 3:30

7"
 "Tropicalia" – 3:23
 "Halo of Gold" – 4:29

Personnel
Beck Hansen – vocals
Roger Joseph Manning Jr. – synthesizer, organ, percussion
Justin Meldal-Johnsen – acoustic bass, percussion
Joey Waronker – drums, percussion, drum machine
Smokey Hormel – percussion, cuíca, acoustic guitar
David Ralicke – flute, trombone

References

External links

Beck songs
1998 singles
Song recordings produced by Nigel Godrich
Songs written by Beck
1998 songs
Geffen Records singles